Chahar Ab (also Romanized as Chahār Āb) is a village in Kashkan Rural District, Shahivand District, Dowreh County, Lorestan Province, Iran. At the 2006 census, its population was 202, in 36 families.

References 

Towns and villages in Dowreh County